Delphine Nkansa (born 21 September 2001) is a Belgian athlete. She was the Belgian national champion over 200m in 2022.

Personal life
Born in Belgium, Nkansa grew up in Lisbon, Portugal after her family moved for her father’s work. After achieving her baccalaureate in Lisbon, Nkansa moved to Paris to study law.

Career

2022
Nkansa set a new personal best time of 23.03 seconds for the 200 metres in July 2022 in Albi, France. At the same event she improved her 100m personal best to 11.26 seconds to make her second fastest Belgian woman of all time in the event behind only Kim Gevaert. Nkansa qualified from her 200m heat at the 2022 European Athletics Championships in a time of 23.08 and was eleventh fastest in the semi-finals running 23.28. This matched her result in the 100m as she qualified from the heat to the semi-finals and also finished eleventh fastest in a time of 11.39 seconds.
Nkansa was part of the Belgian 4 x 100 metres relay team that qualified for the final with a seasons best time of 43.58 in the semi-final, before finishing sixth in the final.

2023
Nkansa ran a new personal best over 60m of 7.24 seconds in January 2023. Soon afterwards she finished runner-up to Rani Rosius in the 60m at the Belgian national indoors championships in February 2023. She was subsequently selected for the 2023 European Athletics Indoor Championships in March 2023, in which she qualified through the rounds for the final. She finished sixth in the final in a new personal best time of 7.19 seconds.

References

External Links

 2001 births
Living people
Belgian female sprinters
21st-century Belgian women
Sportspeople from Lisbon